Gary Alan Jacquith (born May 30, 1948) is an American former professional ice hockey defenseman.

During the 1975–76 season, Jacquith played two games in the World Hockey Association with the San Diego Mariners.

References

External links

1948 births
Living people
American men's ice hockey defensemen
Binghamton Dusters players
Boston Braves (AHL) players
New Hampshire Wildcats men's ice hockey players
Rochester Americans players
San Diego Mariners players